Kharsawan Assembly constituency is an assembly constituency in the Indian state of Jharkhand.

Overview 
As defined in the Delimitation of Parliamentary and Assembly Constituencies Order, 2008, Kharsawan Assembly constituency covers Kharsawan and Kuchai police stations and Seraikella police station (excluding Seraikella municipality and Govindpur, Para, Manik Bazar, Tangrani, Pathanmara, Jordiha Gurugudia and Badakakda gram panchayats), village 98-Dighi in Rajnagar police station, and Bhoya Keadchalam, Domra Parnia, Lota, Thakurgutu, Dopai-Gamhariya, Sarda, Matkamhatu, Khuntpani, Chiru and Rajabasa gram panchayats in Chaibasa Mufassil police station.

The constituency is reserved for members of Scheduled Tribes. Kharsawan Assembly constituency is within Khunti Lok Sabha constituency.

Members of Legislative Assembly

Election Results

2019

See also
Vidhan Sabha
List of states of India by type of legislature

References

Assembly constituencies of Jharkhand
Seraikela Kharsawan district